The Australia and New Zealand School of Government (ANZSOG) is an educational institution that teaches strategic management and high-level policy to public sector leaders.

Formed in 2002 by a consortium of governments, universities and business schools from Australia and New Zealand, the School is home to a substantial research program that aims to deepen government, community and academic understanding of public administration, policy and management.

ANZSOG also administers an internationally recognised case teaching program with outstanding teachers and a library of case studies, developed specifically for the use of ANZSOG and its affiliates, in the specialist teaching area of public policy and management, in the ANZSOG region – Australia, New Zealand and the Pacific.

Members

Government members 
 New Zealand Government
 ACT Government
 Commonwealth of Australia
 Northern Territory Government
 State of New South Wales
 State of Queensland
 State of South Australia
 State of Tasmania
 State of Victoria
 State of Western Australia

University members 
 Australian National University
 Carnegie Mellon University Australia
 Charles Darwin University
 Curtin University of Technology
 Flinders University
 Griffith University
 Melbourne Business School
 Monash University
 University of Melbourne
 University of New South Wales
 University of Queensland
 University of Sydney
 University of Canberra
 University of Tasmania
 University of Western Australia
 Victoria University of Wellington

The current dean is Professor Ken Smith.

External links
Official site

Educational institutions established in 2002
Universities in Australia
Education in New Zealand
Trans-Tasman organisations
2002 establishments in Australia